Supreme Soviet elections were held in the Ukrainian SSR on 26 June 1938 to elect deputies to the Supreme Soviet. They were held alongside elections to oblast councils and followed the national elections to the Supreme Soviet of the Soviet Union on 12 December 1937.

Background

A new Constitution of the Ukrainian SSR ("Stalin's Constitution") had been adopted in 1937. Previously on 5 December 1936 at the 8th Extraordinary Congress of Soviets of the Soviet Union, there was already adopted the Constitution of the whole Union which became a base for development and adaptation of constitutions of union republics. On resolution of Presidium of the All–Ukrainian Central Executive Committee (AUCEC) of 13 June 1936, there was established the AUCEC Constitutional Commission. By prior decision of Politburo of Central Committee of the Communist Party (Bolsheviks) of Ukraine (CC CP(b)U), the Presidium approved personnel composition of the Constitutional Commission. The developed draft of Constitution of the UkrSSR by the commission was submitted under existing practice to CC CP(b)U, Central Committee of the All-Union Communist Party (Bolsheviks) (CC VCP(b)), after which the agreed draft was reviewed by the AUCEC Presidium. After the AUCEC Presidium approved the draft it decided to submit the draft for review to the 16th Extraordinary All-Ukrainian Congress of Soviets.

Coincidentally in 1937 to Ukraine were dispatched three personal representatives of Stalin Vyacheslav Molotov, Nikolai Yezhov, and Nikita Khrushchev. After their arrival in Ukraine were arrested and executed 17 members of government. The chairman of Sovnarkom of the UkrSSR Panas Lyubchenko committed suicide. The CC CP(b)U that was recently elected in 1937 at the XIII Party's congress was routed, 10 out of 11 members of Politburo along with 4 out of 5 candidate members perished, while all 9 members Orgburo were repressed.

Results

Political affiliation
 Communist Party of Ukraine – 73%
 Komsomol of Ukraine – 10.9%
 Unaffiliated – 16.1%

Social background
 Workers – 50.3%
 Peasants – 25%
 Intelligentsiya – 24.7%

National background
 Ukrainians – 61.5%
 Russians – 34.5%
 Other nationalities – 4%

Gender background
 Women – 26.6%
 Men – 73.4%

List of deputies
incomplete list

References

External links
 List of deputies of Supreme Soviet of the Ukrainian SSR 1st convocation (1938 – 1947) (Список депутатов Верховного Совета Украинской ССР I созыва (1938 - 1947)). Handbook on history of the Communist Party and the Soviet Union 1898–1991.
 The 1937 Constitution of the UkrSSR. Verkhovna Rada website.
 Ukase of Presidium of the Verkhovna Rada of the UkrSSR of 21 January 1940 (Указ Президії Верховної Ради УРСР). Zbruc.

Parliamentary election
Parliamentary elections in Ukraine
1938 elections in the Soviet Union
June 1938 events